Anthony Peden (born 15 September 1970) is a New Zealand cyclist. He competed at the 2000 Summer Olympics in Sydney, in the Men's keirin and the men's sprint. Peden was the head sprint coach at Cycling New Zealand from 2013 until his resignation in 2018. Peden is now the Head Sprint Coach of the Chinese National track cycling team.

Peden won the coach of the year award at the 2014 Halberg Awards.

References

External links
 

1970 births
Living people
New Zealand male cyclists
Olympic cyclists of New Zealand
Cyclists at the 2000 Summer Olympics
New Zealand sports coaches
Cycling coaches
https://www.stuff.co.nz/sport/other-sports/104321837/sprint-coach-anthony-peden-steps-down-from-coaching-role